The 2022 A-GAME 200 was the 10th stock car race of the 2022 NASCAR Xfinity Series season, the 41st iteration of the event, and the fourth and final race of the Dash 4 Cash. The race was held on April 30, 2022, in Dover, Delaware at Dover Motor Speedway, a 1 mile (1.6 km) permanent oval-shaped racetrack. The race was contested over 200 laps. The final Dash 4 Cash in this race is consisted of Noah Gragson, Landon Cassill, A. J. Allmendinger, and Ryan Sieg, since they were the highest finishing Xfinity regulars after Talladega Superspeedway. At race's end, Josh Berry of JR Motorsports would take the win, after leading 55 laps. This was Berry's second career Xfinity Series win, and his first of the season. To fill out the podium, Justin Allgaier of JR Motorsports and Ty Gibbs of Joe Gibbs Racing would finish 2nd and 3rd, respectively. Noah Gragson would win the Dash 4 Cash, after finishing in front of Cassill, Allmendinger, and Sieg.

Background 
Dover Motor Speedway (formerly Dover Downs International Speedway and later Dover International Speedway) is a race track in Dover, Delaware, United States. The track has hosted at least one NASCAR Cup Series race each year since 1969, including two per year from 1971 to 2020. In addition to NASCAR, the track also hosted USAC and the Indy Racing League. The track features one layout, a  concrete oval, with 24° banking in the turns and 9° banking on the straights. The speedway is owned and operated by Speedway Motorsports.

The track, nicknamed "The Monster Mile", was built in 1969 by Melvin Joseph of Melvin L. Joseph Construction Company, Inc., with an asphalt surface, but was replaced with concrete in 1995. Six years later in 2001, the track's capacity increased to 135,000 seats, giving the track the largest seating capacity of any sports venue in the mid-Atlantic region. In 2002, the name changed to Dover International Speedway from Dover Downs International Speedway after Dover Downs Gaming and Entertainment split, making Dover Motorsports. From 2007 to 2009, the speedway worked on an improvement project called "The Monster Makeover", which expanded facilities at the track and beautified the track. Depending on configuration, the track's capacity is at 95,500 seats. Its grand total maximum capacity was at 135,000 spectators. On November 8, 2021, it was announced that Dover Motorsports Inc. was purchased by Speedway Motorsports Inc.; effectively making Dover International Speedway a SMI track with the track being renamed to its current name.

Entry list 

 (R) denotes rookie driver.
 (i) denotes driver who is ineligible for series driver points.

Practice 
The only 30-minute practice session was held on Friday, April 29, at 3:00 PM EST.

Full qualifying results

Qualifying 
Qualifying was held on Friday, April 29, at 3:30 PM EST. Since Dover Motor Speedway is an oval track, the qualifying system used is a single-car, two-lap system with only one round. Whoever sets the fastest time in the round wins the pole. 

Race results 
Stage 1 Laps: 25

Stage 2 Laps: 25

Stage 3 Laps: 110

Standings after the race 

Drivers' Championship standings

Note: Only the first 12 positions are included for the driver standings.

References 

2022 NASCAR Xfinity Series
NASCAR races at Dover Motor Speedway
A-GAME 200
2022 in sports in Delaware